The Washington Glass School was founded in 2001 by Washington, DC area artists Tim Tate and Erwin Timmers.

The school teaches classes on how to make kiln cast, fused, and cold worked glass sculptures and art. It is the second largest warm glass school in the United States.

History
Co-Founder Tim Tate's glass sculpture at the 2000 Artomatic art event  was acquired by the Smithsonian American Art Museum for the Renwick Gallery's permanent collection. That sale also provided the funds that started the Washington Glass School. Erwin Timmers' artwork was also on exhibit at Artomatic, where after the show, they began to collaborate, later teaming up to start the Washington Glass School & Studio. Michael Janis joined the school in 2003, and became a Co-Director of the Washington Glass School in 2005. 

The school was initially located in the neighborhood where the Washington Nationals Park now stands, and as a result of the construction of the park, had to relocate to the current location in Mount Rainier, Maryland, just over the border with Washington, DC.

In 2008, Artomatic organized an exhibit that focused on how three "glass" cities approach the sculptural medium and hosted by the Washington Glass School. The collaborative show was titled "Glass 3″ referencing the invited glass centers of Washington, DC, Toledo, Ohio and Sunderland, England.
The exhibit featured nearly 50 glass artists and created an international partnership and strong relationships that led to more international collaborative interactions. Tim Tate and Michael Janis' Fulbright Scholarships were both completed at the University of Sunderland and the UK's National Glass Centre.

Washington Glass Studio
The Washington Glass Studio was established as part of the school in 2001 to create site specific art for architectural and landscape environments. The studio draws on the Washington Glass School Co-director's educational backgrounds in steel and glass sculpture, electronics and video media, architectural design, and ecological sustainability.

Notable public art projects by Washington Glass Studio include the monumental glass doors for the Library of Congress John Adams Building. Under the auspices of the U.S. Architect of the Capitol, the bronze doors to the John Adams Building were replaced in 2013 with code-complaint sculpted glass panels mirroring the original bronze door sculptures by American artist, Lee Lawrie, designed to commemorate the history of the written word, depicting gods of writing as well as real-life Native American Sequoyah. " 

The public art commission for artwork at the entrance to the Laurel Branch Library was awarded to the Washington Glass Studio in 2016. In a series of glass making workshops, images of books and stories, education and learning, and shared aspirations were created at the Washington Glass School to be incorporated into the internally illuminated tower.

Faculty

Directors 

Michael Janis
Tim Tate
 Erwin Timmers

Glass Secessionism 
The Washington Glass School championed a new art movement dubbed Glass Secessionism to "underscore and define the 21st Century Sculptural Glass Movement and to illustrate the differences and strengths compared to late 20th century technique-driven glass. While the 20th century glass artists contributions have been spectacular and ground breaking, this group focuses on the aesthetic of the 21st century. The object of the Glass-Secession is to advance glass as applied to sculptural expression; to draw together those glass artists practicing or otherwise interested in the arts, and to discuss from time to time examples of the Glass-Secession or other narrative work."
Reflecting the evolving nature of glass art, the name of the Facebook group was amended in 2017 to "21st Century Glass : Conversations and Images / Glass Secessionism".

References

External links 

 
 Facebook group page, 21st Century Glass : Conversations and Images / Glass Secessionism provides examples of 21st century glass sculpture and open discussion topics regarding new directions in glass art.
 "Capitol Improvements", American Craft Magazine reviews the process in the school's creation of the new cast glass doors for the US Library of Congress Adams Building. June/July 2013.
 "All Things Considered - Interview with Tim Tate: A Tiny Digital Arts Revolution, Encased In Glass." National Public Radio. August 3, 2009.
 WETA TV - "Around Town Visits the Washington Glass School." Aired July 16, 2007.

Glassmaking schools